Kuryinsky District is an administrative and municipal district (raion), one of the fifty-nine in Altai Krai, Russia. It is located in the south of the krai. Its administrative center is the rural locality (a selo) of Kurya. Population:  The population of Kurya accounts for 34.6% of the district's total population.

References

Notes

Sources

Districts of Altai Krai